Tangail-8 is a constituency represented in the Jatiya Sangsad (National Parliament) of Bangladesh since 2019 by Joaherul Islam of the Awami League.

Boundaries 
The constituency encompasses Basail and Sakhipur upazilas.

History 
The constituency was created for the first general elections in newly independent Bangladesh, held in 1973.

Members of Parliament

Elections

Elections in the 2010s 
Shawkat Momen Shahjahan died in January 2014, barely two weeks after the general election. Anupam Shahjahan Joy, his son, was elected in a by-election conducted in March and April. He defeated independent candidates Md. Malek Mian, Abu Sayed Azad, and Liakat Ali, and Jatiya Party (Ershad) candidate Sadek Siddiqui.

Shawkat Momen Shahjahan was re-elected unopposed in the 2014 general election after opposition parties withdrew their candidacies in a boycott of the election.

Elections in the 2000s

Elections in the 1990s 
Abdul Kader Siddique was expelled from the Awami League in 1999 over disagreements with party leadership. He resigned from Parliament, and stood as an independent candidate in the resulting November 1999 by-election. He lost to Shawkat Momen Shahjahan of the Awami League.

References

External links
 

Parliamentary constituencies in Bangladesh
Tangail District